Poša is a village and municipality in Vranov nad Topľou District in the Prešov Region of eastern Slovakia.

History
In historical records the village was first mentioned in 1386.

Geography
The municipality lies at an altitude of 125 metres and covers an area of 8.447 km2. It has a population of about 844 people.

External links
 
 
 http://www.statistics.sk/mosmis/eng/run.html

Villages and municipalities in Vranov nad Topľou District